Pseudatemelia flavifrontella is a species of gelechioid moths.

Taxonomy
In the systematic layout used here, it is placed within the subfamily Amphisbatinae of the concealer moth family (Oecophoridae). The Amphisbatinae have alternatively been merged into the Oecophorinae, raised to full family rank, or placed as a subgroup of the Depressariinae (or Depressariidae if ranked as family). P. flavifrontella was first scientifically described by M. Denis & I. Schiffermüller in 1775. For quite some time however, its description was erroneously attributed to J. Hübner in 1801.

Recent research has shown that the genus Pseudatemelia is one of those close to Lypusa, the type of the supposed Tineoidea family Lypusidae. The genus Pseudatemelia has to be dissolved and all the species previously assigned to it has to be transferred to the genus Agnoea. Consequently this species should be assigned to the genus Agnoea, Lypusidae family, Gelechioidea superfamily.

Distribution and habitat
This species can be found in Europe, where it inhabits woodlands, and in the Near East. At the periphery of its range, it is not common; in the UK for example it is only patchily distributed, ranging northwestwards only to the English Midlands and Wales.

Description

The wingspan of this moth is about 20 mm; its forewing coloration is a quite drab light taupe, mottled with slightly darker tiny specks. The head is covered in orange-yellow hairs. Antennae reach about ¾ length of the long forewings, that are held in shallow roof-shaped position. Dorsal surface of the abdomen has very narrow scales.

Biology
The adults fly from May to July depending on the location; they appear to be predominantly or exclusively nocturnal and can be attracted by light. Caterpillars stay in a portable case. Little is known about the food of its caterpillars. Like their relatives, they appear to be adaptable and have been recorded on such diverse foodstuffs as dead plants, dry leaves, dried insect specimens and even feathers.

References

  (1942): Eigenartige Geschmacksrichtungen bei Kleinschmetterlingsraupen ["Strange tastes among micromoth caterpillars"]. Zeitschrift des Wiener Entomologen-Vereins 27: 105-109 [in German]. PDF fulltext
  [2010]: UKMoths – Pseudatemelia flavifrontella. Retrieved 2010-APR-27.
  (2004): Butterflies and Moths of the World, Generic Names and their Type-species – Pseudatemelia. Version of 2004-NOV-05. Retrieved 2010-APR-27.
  (2001): Markku Savela's Lepidoptera and some other life forms –  Pseudatemelia flavifrontella.

Amphisbatinae
Moths of Europe
Moths of Asia
Moths described in 1775